Émilie Louise Marie Françoise Joséphine Pellapra (11 November 1806 – 22 May 1871), comtesse de Brigode, princesse de Chimay, was the daughter of Françoise-Marie LeRoy and possibly Napoleon I of France. She claimed to be the product of her mother's affair with the French Emperor which supposedly took place in April 1805, but this date is impossible with Émilie's birth in November 1806. She was first married to Count Louis-Marie of Brigode (1777–1827) and later married to Prince Joseph de Riquet de Caraman (1808–1886), 17th prince de Chimay.

She was born in Lyon on November 11, 1806, the daughter of Madame Pellapra, née Françoise-Marie LeRoy, the wife of a rich financier named Henri (de) Pellapra.

For Émilie to have been the daughter of Napoleon it would have been necessary that he stayed in Lyon in February 1806. However, no stay in this city at that time seems to have taken place and, according to several authors (in particular André Gavoty in the Bulletin de l'Institut Napoleon April 1950), Napoleon only met LeRoy in 1810. 

Émilie Pellapra married Count Louis Marie de Brigode who died shortly after, though they had twins:
 Fernand de Brigode (1 August 1827 – October 1830), died young;
 Louis Marie Henri Pierre Désiré de Brigode (1 August 1827 – 1859), marquis of Brigode, French peer, Mayor of Romilly, married Annette du Hallay-Coëtquen (1831–1905).

She remarried on 30 August 1830 to Prince Joseph de Riquet de Caraman (1808-1886), 17th prince de Chimay, son of Prince François-Joseph-Philippe de Riquet and Thérésa Cabarrus, and had four children: 
 Marie Thérèse Émilie de Riquet (1832–1851), countess of Lagrange;
 Marie Joseph Guy Henry Philippe de Riquet, 18th prince de Chimay (1836–1892), married firstly Marie de Montesquiou-Fezensac, then Mathilde de Barandiaran; father of Marie Joseph Anatole Élie and Élisabeth, comtesse Greffulhe; 
 Valentine de Riquet (1839–1914), Comtesse de Caraman-Chimay, first Princess Paul de Bauffremont, then Princess Georges Bibesco;
 Eugène de Riquet (1847–1881), married Louise de Graffenried-Villars; his daughter Hélène Marie married John Francis Charles, 7th Count de Salis-Soglio. 

She died at the Château de Menars on May 22, 1871.

References

Further reading 

 

1806 births
1871 deaths
French memoirists
French princesses
Illegitimate children of Napoleon
19th-century memoirists